Nutfield can refer to:
Nutfield, Victoria, suburb of Melbourne, Victoria, Australia
Nutfield, Surrey in Surrey, England
Nutfield, County Fermanagh, a townland in County Fermanagh, Northern Ireland
Nutfield, New Hampshire, the colonial township from which the modern places of Londonderry, Derry, Windham and parts of Salem, Hudson, and the city of Manchester were formed.